Shaolin King of Martial Arts is a 2002 Chinese wuxia television series directed by Chang Hsin-yen, Liu Jiacheng and Wu Chia-tai. It starred Wu Jing, Yaqi, Chunyu Shanshan, Gao Haiyan, Huang Yi, Yu Chenghui, Ji Chunhua, Yu Hai and Xu Xiangdong in the leading roles.

Plot
The story is set in the late Ming dynasty, when corrupt officials dominate the government and the aggressive wokou (Japanese pirates) constantly raid China's coastal regions. General Qi Jiguang and his cousin, Qi Jiyu, organise a military force called the 'Qi Family Army' to resist the invaders. They score several victories over the enemy.

Oshima Masao, the wokou chief, is not content with defeat, so he bribes the eunuch Tong Dabao, a close aide of the incompetent emperor, to spread slanderous rumours about the Qi Family Army in the hope that the emperor will order the army to be disbanded. Qi Jiyu, assisted by his son Qi Shaozheng, manages to find evidence of Tong's treachery, and intends to report Tong to the emperor. However, Tong finds out, destroys the evidence, and has Qi Jiyu arrested and imprisoned. Tong then attempts to induce Qi Jiyu into accusing Qi Jiguang of treason by tempting him with promises of riches and fame but Qi Jiyu refuses. Qi Jiyu secretly tells Qi Shaozheng to escape and warn the Qi Family Army about Tong's plot.

Tong Dabao is furious when he learns that his plan has been foiled. He orders the execution of Qi Jiyu and his clan, and places a huge bounty on Qi Shaozheng's head. Qi Shaozheng flees to Shaolin Monastery for refuge and is accepted by Abbot Zhiyi as a student and is renamed "Tanzhi". When Tong Dabao discovers that Qi Shaozheng has survived, he sends the Jinyiwei to surround Shaolin and threatens to destroy the monastery if the monks do not hand over Qi. The monks refuse to capitulate so Tong orders Shaolin to be burnt down. Zhiyi dies in the blaze. Before his death, Zhiyi instructed a monk called Sanjiao to protect Tanzhi and bring the latter to the Southern Shaolin Monastery.

Tanzhi and Sanjiao travel to Southern Shaolin and encounter numerous dangers along the way. While in the wilderness, Tanzhi is injured but is saved by a girl called Xiaoni, and is forced by her grandfather to marry her. The old man is a former soldier in the Qi Family Army. When he learns of Tanzhi's true identity, he decides to allow the boy to proceed with his journey, much to his granddaughter's dismay. Tanzhi and Sanjiao later join a performance troupe by accident, where Tanzhi develops feelings for the maidens Baihe and Honglian. They leave after driving away Tong Dabao's henchmen and eventually arrive in Southern Shaolin, where Tanzhi becomes a student of Abbot Yuanzhao. In Southern Shaolin, Tanzhi befriends several seniors and meets a group of young nuns living near the monastery. He also gets involved in another romantic relationship with a Japanese girl who disguised herself as a man so that she can infiltrate Shaolin and learn martial arts.

Tanzhi trains hard in martial arts to fulfil his quest for justice. With strong backing and support from his friends and allies, he rebuilds the Qi Family Army and succeeds in defeating and driving away the wokou. He uses the powerful skills he mastered to overcome and kill Tong Dabao and avenge his family.

Cast
 Wu Jing as Tanzhi / Qi Shaozheng
 Yaqi as Xiaoni
 Chunyu Shanshan as Sanjiao
 Gao Haiyan as Fajing
 Huang Yi as Ounü
 Yu Chenghui as Tong Dabao
 Ji Chunhua as Tanfei
 Yu Hai as Shantong
 Xu Xiangdong as Yuanzhao
 Xu Huanshan as Old Man
 Wang Yu as Zhiyi
 Tan Qiao as Fayan
 Xiao Yuewen as Faling
 Sui Shuyang as Faneng
 Chen Jianfeng as Faming
 Yang Fan as Oshima Masao
 Wu Yijiang as Dahan
 Tian Haiyan as Baihe
 Kexin as Honglian
 Jin Demao as Yu Fei
 Ding Xiaowa as Lihua
 Shu Yan as A'xiang
 Lin Jie as Meihua
 Zhao Lianfen as Juhua
 Shi Xiaohu as Wufan
 Hao Yuan as Ruolan
 Liu Fang as A'mu
 Zhang Hao as Gui Silang
 Lü Qiang as Badachui
 Huang Haibing as Emperor

External links
 Shaolin King of Martial Arts on Sina.com

2002 Chinese television series debuts
Television series set in the Ming dynasty
Chinese wuxia television series
Mandarin-language television shows